Gudiño (sometimes written without the tilde as Gudino) is a Spanish surname. Notable people with this name include:

Surname
 Alfredo Anaya Gudiño (born 1950), Mexican politician
 Andrés Gudiño (born 1997), Mexican footballer
 Irving Gudiño (born 2000), Panamanian footballer
 Gabriel Gudiño (born 1992), Argentine footballer
 Jorge Gudiño (1920–1995), Mexican basketball player
 Raúl Gudiño (born 1996), Mexican footballer
 Rodrigo Gudiño, Mexican-Canadian film director and editor

Middle name
 Carolina Gudiño Corro (born 1981), Mexican politician
 Eduardo Gudiño Kieffer (1935–2002), Argentine writer
 Francisco Javier Gudiño Ortiz (born 1968), Mexican politician
 José de Jesús Gudiño Pelayo (1943–2010), Mexican jurist

Other uses
 Julian Feoli-Gudino (born 1987), Costa Rican gridiron football player
 Jesse González (born 1995 as José Luis González Gudiño), American professional soccer player

See also